Ibn Daqiq al-'Id (1228–1302), born in Yanbu into the Arab tribe of Banu Qushayr. He is accounted as one of Islam's great scholars in the fundamentals of Islamic law and belief, and was an authority in the Shafi'i legal school. Although Ibn Daqiq al-'Id studied Shafi'i jurisprudence under Ibn 'Abd al-Salam, he was also proficient in Maliki fiqh. He served as chief qadi of the Shafi'i school in Egypt. Ibn Daqiq al-'Id taught hadith to al-Dhahabi, al-Nuwayri, and other leading scholars of the next generation. In his lifetime, Ibn-Daqiq wrote many books but his commentary on the Nawawi Forty Hadiths has become his most popular. In it he comments on the forty hadiths compiled by Yahya Al-Nawawi and known as the al-Nawawi's Forty Hadith. His commentary has become so popular that it is virtually impossible for any scholar to write a serious book about the forty hadiths without quoting Ibn-Daqiq.

See also

 List of Ash'aris and Maturidis

References

Asharis
Egyptian Maliki scholars
Mujaddid
Hadith scholars
Shafi'i fiqh scholars
Shaykh al-Islāms
Egyptian Sunni Muslims
Egyptian imams
13th-century Egyptian judges
Theologians from the Mamluk Sultanate
13th-century Muslim scholars of Islam
1228 births
1302 deaths
14th-century Egyptian judges
13th-century Arabs
Banu 'Amir